The Northwest Missouri State−Pittsburg State football rivalry, also known as the Fall Classic at Arrowhead, is a college football game between Mid-America Intercollegiate Athletics Association (MIAA) rivals Northwest Missouri State University and Pittsburg State University. From 2002 to 2013, the game was played at Arrowhead Stadium, home of the Kansas City Chiefs. The games were played at the teams' home field, due to being unable to reach terms with the Kansas City Chiefs, from 2014 to 2018. The game is set to return to Arrowhead Stadium in 2019.

Overview
While at Arrowhead, the Fall Classic drew more than 20,000 fans each year (including 26,695 in 2004), the largest attendance of any regular-season NCAA Division II sporting event.

Since 1991 the two MIAA rivals have appeared in 15 NCAA Division II National Football Championship title games. Pittsburg State is 2–3 winning in 1991 and 2011, and was runner up in 1992, 1995 and 2004 (in addition it polled #1 in 1961). Northwest is 6–4, winning the titles in 1998, 1999, 2009, 2013, 2015 and 2016 and was runner up in 2005, 2006, 2007 and 2008. In addition to the regular season games the two teams have also played each other in 2004, 2005, 2008 and 2011 in Division II playoff games. The two teams have combined for at least a share of all but two MIAA championships since 1989.

In every matchup at Arrowhead except 2003, at least one of the teams was ranked in the Top 10 in Division II. In 2013, 2012, 2011, 2009, 2008, 2006 and 2004 both teams were in the Top 10 including 2004 when they were #1 and #2.

On February 11, 2014 Northwest Missouri State announced on their website that they were unable to reach terms with the Kansas City Chiefs to continue the use of Arrowhead Stadium for the contest.

Northwest won ten of the thirteen games played at Arrowhead Stadium.

Game results

A During the 2004, 2005, 2008, and 2011 college football seasons, the Bearcats and Gorillas played twice; in this case, the second meeting was in the playoffs. All other seasons that the two teams played twice was considered a regular season game.

See also  
 List of NCAA college football rivalry games

References

College football rivalries in the United States
Northwest Missouri State Bearcats football
Pittsburg State Gorillas football